= Burbridge Creek =

Stream in Missouri, U.S.

Coordinates: 39.4525407°N 91.689882°W

Burbridge Creek is a stream in the U.S. state of Missouri.

Burbridge Creek has the name of Jesse Burbridge, a pioneer settler.

== See also ==
- List of rivers of Missouri
